The University of California Davis School of Medicine is the medical school of the University of California, Davis. Although the parent institution is located in Davis, California, the medical school is in Sacramento, California.

History
Founded in 1966, the UC Davis School of Medicine graduated its first class of physicians in 1972. The school maintains research facilities on the Davis campus while the majority of the school's teaching and clinical space is located in Sacramento, 17 miles to the east of the Davis campus. With the December 2006 opening of its new Education Building, the school transitioned all medical school classes to the Sacramento campus. Classes are also held in the UC Davis Center for Health and Technology, which connects to the Education Building. Throughout their four years of medical school, students also take part in health care simulations at the UC Davis Health Center for Simulation and Education Enhancement, which is on the third floor of the UC Davis Center for Health and Technology building. Research activities continue in the same capacity at both the Davis and Sacramento campuses.

The school gained national attention in the late 1970s when an applicant challenged the school's affirmative action admissions policy. In a complex and split decision, the Supreme Court of the United States ruled in Regents of the University of California v. Bakke, 438 U.S. 265 (1978), that the applicant had unconstitutionally been denied admission and Bakke was admitted. They also ruled that affirmative action was legal within some limits.

Admissions and ranking
 
Admissions is highly competitive. In 2011, the school received 4,792 applications, offered interviews to 460 applicants of which 100 matriculated. The acceptance rate for applicants to UC Davis School of Medicine is approximately 1.8%. For 2019, U.S. News & World Report ranks UC Davis School of Medicine #9 based on primary care methodology and #30 based on research methodology.

Hospitals
UC Davis Medical Center, located in Sacramento, is one of five teaching hospitals in the University of California system. It ranks among the top 50 hospitals in America, according to an annual survey published by U.S. News & World Report. Other hospitals affiliated with UC Davis school of medicine include:
UC Davis Children's Hospital
UC Davis Cancer Center
Shriners Hospitals for Children – Sacramento
Sacramento VA Medical Center
Kaiser Permanente Medical Centers in Sacramento, Roseville, and South Sacramento

Research
Faculty in the School of Medicine specializes in a wide range of basic and applied research, including those related to neuroscience, cancer biology, vascular biology, genetic diseases and functional genomics, health services, infectious diseases, nutrition, telemedicine, and vision science. The school receives approximately $90 million in NIH funding annually. About half of UC Davis medical students conduct research during their training.

Primary care network
The UC Davis Medical Center operates a network of clinics that provides outpatient medical services to members of the HMO that UC Davis operates. These clinics are staffed by UC Davis medical school faculty and also by staff physicians hired directly by the primary care network (PCN).

Student clinics

UC Davis School of Medicine has student-run clinics, which offers free primary care to the uninsured, low-income and other underserved population of Sacramento and surrounding areas. These clinics provide patients quality health care and allow UC Davis medical students to gain real world clinical experience during the early stages of their training.
Shifa Community Clinic
Clinica Tepati
Knights Landing Clinic
Imani Clinic at Oak Park
Joan Viteri Memorial Clinic
Paul Hom Asian Clinic
Bayanihan Clinic
Willow Clinic
VN CARES (Vietnamese Cancer Awareness Research and Education Society)
HMong Lifting Underserved Barriers (H.L.U.B.) Clinic

See also
List of medical schools in the United States

References

External links
 
 UC Davis School of Medicine on the DavisWiki

University of California, Davis
1966 establishments in California
Educational institutions established in 1966
Medical schools in California